The Bio-economy Research and Technology Council advises the government of Germany on measures to promote the bioeconomy in Germany. The Council makes policy recommendations to policy makers, science and industry in the corresponding fields of research and action. The members of the Council are respected senior figures drawn from across the fields of science.

In developing its reports and recommendations, the Council works independently on its own authority. It is administratively associated with Acatech. The Council is financed by the Federal Ministry of Education and Research.

The BMBF links the Council to the Federal Government and the respective Ministries. The first project phase is scheduled to last three years. The Council is supported by a secretariat located in Berlin.

Tasks
The Council's  task is to advise the Government on strategic fields of action to improve the framework for innovation and new technologies, to promote the development and diffusion of innovative technologies, as well as to identify prospective needs for research.

The Bio-economy Council produces expert reports including recommendations for action. Reports are handed over to policy makers during public events. Such events serve to promote the exchange between science and industry.

The Council moreover issues expert opinions on current topics in response to requests from policy makers, science, and industry. Reports and recommendations are published and made available to the public online and in print.

The Council meets regularly. It draws on additional expertise by commissioning studies and reports as well as by hosting hearings and workshops.

Members
 Dr. Reinhard F. Hüttl (Chair) 
 Chair of the Executive Board, GFZ German Research Centre for Geosciences Potsdam; President of Acatech; Professor of Soil Protection and Re-cultivation at Brandenburg University of Technology Cottbus
 Dr. Andreas J. Büchting (Deputy Chairman)
 Chairman of the Supervisory Board, KWS SAAT AG
 Dr. Bernd Müller-Röber (Deputy Chairman)
 Professor of Molecular Biology; Max-Planck-Institute of Molecular Plant Physiology; Professor at University of Potsdam
 Dr. Joachim von Braun (Deputy Chairman)
 Director, Center for Development Research (ZEF)
 Dr. Achim Bachem 
 Chairman of the Board of Directors, Forschungszentrum Jülich GmbH
 Dr. Helmut Born
 Secretary-General of the German Farmers' Party (Deutscher Bauernverband e.V.)
 Dr. Hannelore Daniel
 Technische Universität München (TUM), Molecular Nutrition Unit
 Dr. Utz-Hellmuth Felcht
 Managing Director, One Equity Partners Europe, Munich; Member of the Acatech Executive Board
 Dr. Thomas Hirth
 Director, Fraunhofer Institute for Interfacial Engineering and Biotechnology; Director of Institute for Inter facial Engineering, University of Stuttgart
 Dr. Folkhard Isermeyer
 President, Johann Heinrich von Thünen Institute Braunschweig, Federal Research Institute for Rural Areas, Forestry and Fisheries
 Dr. Stefan Marcinowski
 Board member of BASF SE
 Dr. Thomas C. Mettenleiter
 President, Friedrich-Loeffler-Institute (FLI) Isle of Riems, Federal Research Institute of Animal Health
 Dr. Alfred Pühler
 CeBiTec, Bielefeld University
 Dr. Manfred Schwerin 
 Professor of Animal Breeding, University of Rostock; Director, Research Institute for the Biology of Farm Animals
 Dr. Wiltrud Treffenfeldt 
 Director Bioprocess R&D, Dow AgroSciences LLC, Indianapolis, USA
 Dr. Fritz Vahrenholt
 Chief Executive Officer, RWE Innogy GmbH
 Dr. Holger Zinke
 Chairman, BRAIN AG
 Dr. Christian Patermann (permanent guest)
 NRW Government Adviser on Knowledge-Based Bio-Economy
 Dr. Alexander Zehnder (permanent guest)
 Director, Water Research Institute, University of Alberta, Edmonton, Alberta, Canada

External links

Environmental policy in Germany
Scientific organisations based in Germany